Symphony in A can refer to:

List of symphonies in A minor
List of symphonies in A major

See also
List of symphonies by key